Arthur Adair Hartman (March 12, 1926 – March 16, 2015) was an American career diplomat who served as Ambassador to France under Jimmy Carter and Ambassador to the Soviet Union under Ronald Reagan.

Career
Hartman served in the United States Army Air Corps from 1944 to 1946. He graduated from Harvard University in 1947 and attended Harvard Law School from 1947 to 1948. Rather than pursuing a degree, he took a job in the Marshall Plan administration in Europe, followed by work in the Foreign Service. Among his many postings with the State Department over the years were positions in Paris, Saigon, London and in Brussels as deputy chief of the U.S. Mission to the European Union. In 1974, Hartman was appointed Assistant Secretary of State for European and Canadian Affairs. From 1977 until 1981 he was the Ambassador to France and from 1981 until 1987 Ambassador to the Soviet Union.

Hartman was a member of the Council on Foreign Relations, the American Academy of Diplomacy, the French American Foundation and was on the Advisory Council of the Brookings Institution. He was awarded the French Légion d'honneur. In 2004, he was one of the 26 founders of Diplomats and Military Commanders for Change. Hartman died on March 16, 2015, in Washington, D.C., four days after his 89th birthday.

References

External links

French American Foundation biography

1926 births
2015 deaths
People from New York City
United States Army personnel of World War II
Harvard Law School alumni
Recipients of the Legion of Honour
Ambassadors of the United States to France
Ambassadors of the United States to the Soviet Union
20th-century American diplomats
United States Career Ambassadors
United States Army Air Forces soldiers